Theodore S. Weiss (September 17, 1927 – September 14, 1992) was an American Democratic Party politician who served in the United States House of Representatives for New York from 1977 until his death in 1992.

Life and career
Weiss was born in 1927 in the Hungarian village of Gáva (now Gávavencsellő) and emigrated to the United States in 1938. He grew up in South Amboy, New Jersey. After graduating from H.G. Hoffman High School in South Amboy in 1946, Weiss served in the United States Army from 1946 to 1947. He graduated from Syracuse University in 1951 before earning his LL.B. from the institution's College of Law in 1952. In 1953, Weiss became a naturalized citizen of the United States. Between 1955 and 1959, he was an assistant New York County District Attorney, before leaving the position to return to private practice.

From 1962 until 1976, Weiss was a member of the New York City Council. He was a delegate to the 1972 Democratic National Convention.  Weiss was elected to Congress in 1976, representing most of Manhattan's West Side, and served from January 3, 1977, until his death. He served on the House Committee on Banking, Finance, and Urban Affairs, the House Committee on Government Operations, and the House Committee on Foreign Affairs. In 1985, Weiss headed a committee that found 90 percent of the twenty to thirty thousand new drugs used on farm animals had not been approved by the Food and Drug Administration in violation of the Federal Food, Drug, and Cosmetic Act. They also found that the FDA failed to remove several drugs already known to be carcinogens.

In 1983, he and seven other representatives sponsored a resolution to impeach Ronald Reagan over his sudden and unexpected invasion of Grenada.

Weiss was known for his avid support of liberal causes, including civil rights, open government, and the arts. However, The New York Times observed in 1991, "Mr. Weiss draws particular scorn from conservatives because of what they see as his grandstanding and his stubborn, uncompromising adherence to his own ideology."

Weiss died three days before the primary election for the renumbered 8th district, which would have also been the date of his sixty-fifth birthday. Due to the Congressman's ailing health, five Democrats appeared on the ballot to challenge him. Nonetheless, Weiss posthumously won the primary by a huge margin. State Assemblyman Jerry Nadler was named to replace Weiss on the ballot. Nadler won a special election for the balance of Weiss' eighth term, and a regular election for a full two-year term; he still holds the seat.

The Ted Weiss Federal Building in Lower Manhattan, adjacent to the African Burial Ground National Monument, was named in Weiss's honor in 2003.

See also
List of Jewish members of the United States Congress
List of United States Congress members who died in office (1950–99)

References

Sources

1927 births
1992 deaths
Jews who emigrated to escape Nazism
Hungarian emigrants to the United States
Hungarian Jews
Jewish members of the United States House of Representatives
Naturalized citizens of the United States
Syracuse University College of Law alumni
New York City Council members
Democratic Party members of the United States House of Representatives from New York (state)
20th-century American politicians
American people of Hungarian-Jewish descent
People from South Amboy, New Jersey
Military personnel from New Jersey
United States Army soldiers
New York (state) lawyers
People from Manhattan
20th-century American lawyers
20th-century American Jews